Ololygon canastrensis is a species of frog in the family Hylidae.
It is endemic to Brazil.
Its natural habitats are subtropical or tropical dry forests, moist savanna, rivers, pastureland, and rural gardens.
It is threatened by habitat loss.

References

canastrensis
Endemic fauna of Brazil
Amphibians described in 1982
Taxonomy articles created by Polbot